Justin A. Johnson (born May 5, 1981) is an American former ice hockey player. He last played with the Toronto Marlies of the American Hockey League (AHL). Johnson played two games in the National Hockey League with the New York Islanders during the 2013–14 NHL season.

Playing career
Following four years with the Alaska Anchorage Seawolves, Johnson began his professional career with the Alaska Aces near the end of the 2005–06 ECHL season.

On October 7, 2010, the Manchester Monarchs signed Johnson to a professional tryout agreement. On August 5, 2011, Johnson was re-signed to a two-year contract extension with the Monarchs. On August 2, 2013, the Bridgeport Sound Tigers signed Johnson to a one-year AHL contract.

In the following 2013–14 season, Johnson was a fixture on the Sound Tigers in adding toughness to the forward lines. On March 3, 2013, Johnson was signed to an NHL contract with parent affiliate, the New York Islanders, for the remainder of the campaign. 
On April 11, 2014, at the age of 32, Johnson made his long-awaited NHL debut against the New Jersey Devils at the Prudential Center.
Johnson made the best of his call-up to the big leagues, scoring a knockdown of the considerably bigger John Scott two days later in the Islanders' final game of the season. In his retirement essay written for The Players' Tribune in 2016, Scott acknowledged the fight as the only clean loss of his NHL career, congratulating Johnson.

Johnson went into the off-season as a free agent. Unable to garner another NHL contract, on September 23, 2014, the Alaska Aces of the ECHL signed Johnson to a one-year deal allowing him to return to his hometown team.

On July 26, 2015, with the Toronto Marlies in need of a physical presence within the organization, Johnson returned to the AHL on a one-year contract.

Career statistics

References

External links

1981 births
Living people
African-American ice hockey players
Alaska Aces (ECHL) players
Alaska Anchorage Seawolves men's ice hockey players
Bridgeport Sound Tigers players
Cincinnati Cyclones (ECHL) players
Ice hockey people from Anchorage, Alaska
Idaho Steelheads (ECHL) players
Manchester Monarchs (AHL) players
New York Islanders players
Omaha Lancers players
Toronto Marlies players
Undrafted National Hockey League players
Utah Grizzlies (ECHL) players
American men's ice hockey right wingers
21st-century African-American sportspeople
20th-century African-American people